Sebastian Spendier (born 17 December 1996) is an Austrian handball player for Handball Tirol and the Austrian national team.

He represented Austria at the 2019 World Men's Handball Championship.

References

1996 births
Living people
Austrian male handball players
Sportspeople from Klagenfurt